Greatest Hits (The Abbey Road Session) is a live-in-studio album by the rock band Therapy?. It was released by Marshall Records on 13 March 2020. The 12 tracks, all re-recordings of UK Top 40 singles originally released between 1992 and 1998, were recorded on 8 November 2019 at Abbey Road Studios in London.

The album was released on black vinyl, translucent green vinyl and double CD. While initial pre-order physical copies carried the "Abbey Road" subtitle, following an issue raised by the studio over naming rights, re-pressings and all digital copies were retitled Greatest Hits (2020 Versions).

The second part of the double CD release, entitled Official Bootleg 1990–2020, features 15 live songs (one to represent each studio album in the band's discography) recorded between 1990 and 2018, compiled from the band's personal archives.

Track listing

Personnel 

Therapy?
 Andy Cairns – vocals, guitar
 Michael McKeegan – bass guitar
 Neil Cooper – drums

Additional musicians
 James Dean Bradfield – guitar, vocals on "Die Laughing"
 Fyfe Ewing – drums, vocals (CD 2, tracks 1–4)
 Graham Hopkins – drums (CD 2, tracks 6–8)
 Martin McCarrick – guitar (CD 2, tracks 6–9)

Production
 Chris Sheldon – producer, engineer

Artwork
 Nigel Rolfe – artwork

Charts

See also 
List of 2020 albums

References 

2020 albums
Therapy? albums
Albums produced by Chris Sheldon